The Grandmother's Tale and Selected Stories is a book by R. K. Narayan with illustrations by his brother R. K. Laxman published in 1994 by Viking Press. The book includes a novella, Grandmother's Tale and some other stories in the characteristic Narayan style that captures suffering through comedic narratives. The book was a bestseller in the United States.

References

Short story collections by R. K. Narayan
1994 short story collections
Viking Press books